Corina Georgiana Ungureanu (born 29 August 1980 in Ploieşti) is a world-class Romanian artistic gymnast who competed internationally between 1993 and 1999. She was a member of two gold medal-winning World Championships teams and was the 1998 European Champion on the floor exercise.

Ungureanu began gymnastics at the Petrolul Ploieşti club in her hometown of Ploieşti, but spent the major part of her career training in Bucharest under Leana Sima. In the national training center in Deva, she was coached by Octavian Belu. Ungureanu's first international assignment was a junior dual meet between Romania and Germany, where she placed first with her team and eighth in the all-around. She resurfaced on the international scene again in 1996, when she won the all-around title at the EcoAir Cup. She did not compete in the 1996 Olympics, but was a member of the gold medal-winning Romanian teams at the 1997 and 1999 World Gymnastics Championships. She was forced to retire in 1999 due to a spinal cord injury.

After retiring from gymnastics, she sparked some controversy by posing nude for the January 2000 edition of Playboy Romania. These pictures were reprinted in Playboy Japan in May 2000 and led to her producing a nude photobook in Japan later that year. In 2002, along with former teammates Lavinia Miloșovici and Claudia Presăcan, Ungureanu appeared in two Japanese DVDs, Gold Bird and Euro Angels, which included scenes of the three gymnasts performing gymnastics routines topless. A second nude photobook appeared at the same time. A number of photographs from the photobook and DVDs were subsequently published in the Japanese magazine Shukan Gendai. An edited version of the DVDs entitled 3 Gold Girls was released in Germany in 2004.

The DVDs proved controversial as some of the scenes and publicity material featured the gymnasts in their official Romanian team leotards. It later emerged that they had not been aware of the contractual obligation to wear their official leotards until filming had already begun. In the wake of the controversy, Ungureanu and her former teammates were banned from coaching or competing in Romania from 2002 to 2007. To compensate, Ungureanu spent some time coaching in Italy.

In 2004, her authorized biography, Corina Ungureanu: Beginning and End, written by Laurian Stãnchescu was published. Ungureanu is now also a spokesmodel for Bucovina SA, a bottled water company in Romania. She currently manages a coffee shop called New Haven in Ploieşti with her boyfriend. In early 2007 she took up a coaching position in England, alongside former colleague Claudia Presăcan.

Ungureanu posed for Playboy Romania again in March 2008.

Major awards
1996 EcoAir Cup: 1st AA
1997 World Artistic Gymnastics Championships: 1st team
1997 International Team Championships: 1st team
1997 International Championship of Romania: 2nd AA
1997 Romanian Nationals: 2nd BB; 4th AA
1997 Germany-Romania dual meet: 1st team
1997 Romania-Italy-Ukraine tri-meet: 1st team; 4th AA
1998 Goodwill Games: 3rd BB; 3rd FX
1998 European Championships: 1st team, FX; 4th UB
1998 International Team Championships: 2nd team
1999 World Gymnastics Championships: 1st team

Key: AA: all-around; BB: balance beam; FX: floor exercise; UB: uneven bars; VT: vault

References

External links

Bio at romanian-gymnastics.com
List of competitive results

 Interview about the DVD controversy

https://web.archive.org/web/20140510235332/http://corinaungureanu.ro/

1980 births
Living people
Sportspeople from Ploiești
Romanian female artistic gymnasts
Medalists at the World Artistic Gymnastics Championships
European champions in gymnastics
Goodwill Games medalists in gymnastics
Competitors at the 1998 Goodwill Games